Yellow corydalis is a common name for several plants and may refer to:

 Corydalis flavula, native to the United States
 Corydalis lutea, native to Italy and Switzerland